Barry O'Neill is an Irish sports broadcaster, producer and a retired politician from County Donegal. He is a producer with Sunday Sport on RTÉ Radio 1. He regularly presents bulletins on RTÉ Radio 1 and RTÉ 2fm. He was elected to Donegal County Council in 2004, 2009 and 2014 before retiring in 2019. He also ran for the party in the 2010 Donegal South-West by-election finishing second behind the winner Pearse Doherty. Because of his involvement with both RTÉ and Fine Gael he has drawn comparisons with George Lee.

O'Neill has won National Radio Awards in 2014 and 2018 for his work with RTE, claiming the PPI National Award for best story in 2014 and the IMRO National Award for best programme in 2018. He is a fan of the Donegal football team and Finn Harps and enjoys music by Rory Gallagher.

References

Year of birth missing (living people)
Living people
Fine Gael politicians
Irish radio producers
Irish sports broadcasters
Local councillors in County Donegal
People from County Donegal
RTÉ Radio 1 presenters
RTÉ 2fm presenters